The Crescent City Historic District is a U.S. Historic District (designated as such on December 5, 1996) located in Crescent City, Florida. The district is bounded by Lake Stella, Vernon Avenue, Lake Crescent, and Orange Avenue. It contains 212 historic buildings.

References

External links
 Putnam County listings at National Register of Historic Places

National Register of Historic Places in Putnam County, Florida
Historic districts on the National Register of Historic Places in Florida